Luigi Sturzo (26 November 1871 – 8 August 1959) was an Italian Catholic priest and prominent politician. He was known in his lifetime as a clerical socialist and is considered one of the fathers of the Christian democratic platform. He was also the founder of the Luigi Sturzo Institute in 1951. Sturzo was one of the founders of the Italian People's Party in 1919, but was forced into exile in 1924 with the rise of Italian fascism, and later the post-war Christian Democrats. In exile in London (and later New York) he published over 400 articles (published after his death under the title Miscellanea Londinese) critical of fascism.

Sturzo's cause for canonization opened on 23 March 2002 and he is titled as a Servant of God.

Life

Priesthood
Luigi Sturzo was born on 26 November 1871 in Caltagirone to Felice Sturzo and Caterina Boscarelli. His twin sister was Emanuela (also known as Nelina). One ancestor - Giuseppe Sturzo - served as the Mayor of Caltagirone in 1864 until an unspecified time and another ancestor was Croce Sturzo who wrote about the Roman Question. His two brothers Luigi and Franco Sturzo were well-known Jesuits. His elder brother Mario (1 November 1861 – 11 November 1941) was a noted theologian and Bishop of Piazza Armerina. His two other sisters were Margherita and the nun Remigia (or Sister Giuseppina).

From 1883 until 1886 he studied at Acireale and then in Noto. He commenced his studies for the ecclesial life in 1888.

Sturzo received his ordination to the priesthood on 19 May 1894 from the Bishop of Caltagirone Saverio Gerbino (at the Chiesa del Santissimo Salvatore) and following his graduation served as a teacher of philosophical and theological studies in Caltagirone; he served as his town's Vice-Mayor from 1905 to 1920. In 1898 he received a doctorate in his philosophical studies from the Pontifical Gregorian in Rome in 1898 and he taught that subject in his hometown from 1898 to 1903. It was around this time that he knew Giacomo Radini-Tedeschi.

In his spare time he liked to collect antique ceramic art and while serving as the Vice-Mayor opened a ceramicists' school in 1918. He also founded the newspaper La Croce di Constantino in Caltagirone in 1897. In 1900 - at the same time as the Boxer Rebellion - Sturzo asked his bishop to serve in the missions in China despite the persecutions the Church was enduring there. But he was denied this request on the account of his precarious state of health. Sturzo also was involved since 1915 with Azione Cattolica. He was also close with Romolo Murri.

Sturzo's political activism and collaboration with his colleagues prevented Giovanni Giolitti assuming power once again in 1922 which allowed for Luigi Facta to assume the prime ministership.

Italian Popular Party

Sturzo was among the founders of the Partito Popolare Italiano on 19 January 1919. The formation of the PPI - with the permission of Pope Benedict XV - represented a tacit and reluctant reversal of the Vatican's Non Expedit of non-participation in Italian politics which was abolished before the November 1919 elections in which the PPI won 20.6% of the vote and 100 seats in the legislature. The PPI was a colossal political force in the nation: between 1919 and 1922 no government could be formed and maintained without the support of the PPI. But a coalition between the Socialists and the PPI was deemed unacceptable within the Vatican despite the Prime Minister Giovanni Giolitti in 1914 proposing it and something his progressive and powerless successors—Bonomi (1921-1922) and Facta (1922)—reimaged as the single possible coalition that excluded the Fascists.

Sturzo was a committed anti-fascist who discussed the ways in which Catholicism and Fascism were incompatible in such works as Coscienza cristiana and criticized what he perceived to be "filo-fascist" elements within the Vatican. Sturzo also wrote about the thought of Saint Augustine of Hippo and Gottfried Wilhelm Leibniz as well as Giambattista Vico and Maurice Blondel. He did this in order to elaborate on what he called the "dialectic of the concrete" and opposed this dialectic as a veer towards absolute idealism and scholastic realism.

Sturzo was not among the 14 PPI members who defected—under pressure from Pope Pius XI—to approve the Acerbo Law in July 1923. Sturzo was forced to resign as the General Secretary of the PPI on 10 July 1923 (he had served as such since 1919) after being unable to obtain the support of the Vatican to continue to oppose Benito Mussolini and his regime. He further resigned from the board on 19 May 1924. After Sturzo's departure the Vatican endorsed the formation of the Unione Nazionale which was pro-fascist and Catholic which hastened the rupture of the PPI and provided political cover for its former members to join Mussolini’s inaugural government. Following the Matteotti affair (after which Sturzo thought the Aventine Secession should return to Parliament) Cardinal Pietro Gasparri acceded to the wishes of Mussolini and forced Sturzo to leave the Italian nation before the re-opening of Parliament commemorating the March on Rome.

Exile
Sturzo was exiled from 1924 to 1946 first in London (1924–40) and then in the United States of America (1940–46). Sturzo left Rome for London on 25 October 1924. Sturzo was consigned to a 3-month educational trip in London; but the choice of London was perhaps intended to isolate Sturzo because he did not speak the language and it did not contain a large population of like-minded Catholics. He moved to the residence of the Oblates of Saint Charles in Bayswater and then in January 1925 to the Servites at their priory of Saint Mary in Fulham Road where he was asked to leave in 1926 because the Servites' motherhouse in Rome was being denied funds as long as Sturzo was their guest.

In 1926 he refused an offer from the Vatican - communicated through Cardinal Francis Bourne - to serve as a chaplain in a convent in Chiswick and lodging for his twin sister Nelina in exchange for ending his journalistic activism and issuing a "spontaneous declaration" that he was retired from politics in full. Instead in November 1926 he moved into a flat at 213b Gloucester Terrace in Bayswater with his sister where the pair lived as lodgers until 1933. After the signing of the Lateran Treaty in 1929 he was offered an appointment as a Canon of Saint Peter's Basilica in Rome again in exchange for his permanent renunciation of politics.

On 22 September 1940 he boarded the Samaria in Liverpool bound for New York hoping for an academic appointment and arrived there on 3 October. But he was instead sent to Saint Vincent's Hospital in Jacksonville in Florida which was filled with priests who were ill and about to die. Beginning in 1941 he cooperated with agents from the British Security Co-Ordination as well as the Office of Strategic Services and the Office of War Information providing them with his assessments of the political forces with the Italian resistance movement and radio broadcasts to the Italian peninsula. Sturzo returned to Brooklyn in April 1944 but his return to his homeland received a Vatican-Alcide De Gasperi veto in October 1945 and May 1946. De Gasperi with Sturzo on the scope of a referendum to abolish the monarch as the head of state.

Return and death

Sturzo set off to return to his homeland on the Vulcania on 27 August 1946 (after the June Referendum had abolished the need for a monarch) but did not have a dominant role in Italian politics after his arrival on 6 September in Naples. He instead retired to the outskirts of Rome after landing in Naples. In 1951 he founded the Luigi Sturzo Institute which was designed to endorse research in historical science as well as in economics and politics. He was made a Senator on 17 December 1952 and Senator for life in 1953 at the behest of President Luigi Einaudi and he obtained a dispensation from Pope Pius XII in order to accept the title.

On 23 July 1959 he celebrated Mass and when he came to the consecration of the Eucharist he looked down and slumped. He was carried to his bed still in his vestments and his health took a sharp decline until his death. Sturzo died in Rome in the afternoon of 8 August 1959 at the general house of the Canossians; his remains were interred in the church of San Lorenzo al Verano but were transferred in 1962 to the church of Santissimo Salvatore in Caltagirone.

Beatification cause
The beatification process for Sturzo opened under Pope John Paul II on 23 March 2002 after the Congregation for the Causes of Saints issued the official "nihil obstat" decree and titled the priest as a Servant of God. Cardinal Camillo Ruini inaugurated the diocesan process of investigation on 3 May 2002. The diocesan process concluded on 24 November 2017 in the Lateran Palace.

Recent reports indicate - as of August 2017 - that the beatification cause is gaining greater momentum and is close to a conclusion that would see Sturzo named as Venerable.

The current postulator for this cause is Avv. Carlo Fusco.

See also

 Luigi Sturzo Institute

Authorship
Sturzo was the author of several works in relation to philosophical and political thought. This included:
 Church and State (1939)
 The True Life (1943)
 The Inner Laws of Society (1944)
 Spiritual Problems of Our Times (1945)
 Italy and the Coming World (1945)

Notes and references

Bibliography

De Grand, Alexander. 1982. Italian Fascism: Its Origins & Development. Lincoln: University of Nebraska Press.
 Delzell, Charles F. "The Emergence of Political Catholicism in Italy: Partio Popolare, 1919-1926." Journal of Church and State (1980) 22#3: 543-546.  online
Farrell-Vinay, Giovanna. 2004. "The London Exile of Don Luigi Sturzo (1924-1940)." HeyJ. XLV, pp. 158–177.
 Molony, John N. The emergence of political catholicism in Italy: Partito popolare 1919-1926 (1977)
Moos, Malcolm. 1945. "Don Luigi Sturzo--Christian Democrat." The American Political Science Review, 39#2  269-292.
 Murphy, Francis J. "Don Sturzo and the Triumph of Christian Democracy." Italian Americana 7.1 (1981): 89-98. online
Pugliese, Stanislao G. 2001. Italian Fascism and Anti-Fascism: A Critical Anthology. Manchester University Press.
Riccards, Michael P. Vicars of Christ: Popes, Power, and Politics in the Modern World. New York: Herder & Herder.
 Schäfer, Michael. "Luigi Sturzo as a theorist of totalitarianism." Totalitarianism and Political Religions, Volume 1. Routledge, 2004. 39-57.

External links
 Hagiography Circle
 Catholic Culture
 Luigi Sturzo - L'État totalitaire (1938)

1871 births
1959 deaths
20th-century Italian politicians
20th-century Italian Roman Catholic priests
20th-century venerated Christians
Italian anti-communists
Italian anti-fascists
Italian life senators
Italian newspaper founders
Italian People's Party (1919) politicians
Italian Servants of God
People from Caltagirone
Italian political party founders
Politicians of Catholic political parties
Politicians from the Province of Catania
Pontifical Gregorian University alumni
Exiled Italian politicians
Religious leaders from the Province of Catania
Italian Christian socialists